Victor Hugo de Azevedo Coutinho, 18th Count of Azevedo GCC, GCA (12 November 1871–27 June 1955), was a Portuguese naval officer, politician and professor, at the University of Coimbra and later the Escola Naval (Naval School). He was a member of the Portuguese Democratic Party and served as the President of the Council of Ministers (Prime Minister) for 7th government of the First Portuguese Republic (having led the country between 12 December 1914 and 25 January 1915). His government's composition was essentially made up of second-line political figures, and his government was jokingly referred to as "Os miseráveis de Victor Hugo" ("The miserables of Victor Hugo"), a play on the French author Victor Hugo's book Les Misérables.

References

1871 births
1955 deaths
Democratic Party (Portugal) politicians
Foreign ministers of Portugal
Governors-General of Mozambique
Government ministers of Portugal
Naval ministers of Portugal
Portuguese expatriates in Mozambique
Portuguese people of British descent
Presidents of the Chamber of Deputies of Portugal (1910–1926)
Prime Ministers of Portugal